Kirara, Ano ang Kulay ng Pag-ibig? (International title: Kirara, What is the Color of Love?) is a Philippine television drama series broadcast by GMA Network. Directed by Gina Alajar, it stars Erika Ann Luna and Patricia Javier in the title role. It premiered on August 16, 1999. The series concluded on November 2, 2001 with a total of 566 episodes.

Cast and characters

Book 1
 Erika Ann Luna as Kirara
 Amy Austria as Rose
 Sandy Andolong as Charito
 Tirso Cruz III as Jon
 Daniel Fernando as Ka Puroy
 Joonee Gamboa as Don Romano Santillanes
 Leni Rivera as Vicky
 Ryan Eigenmann as Bulik
 Aya Medel as Bening / Raquel
 Geoff Eigenmann as Joshua
 Joanne Miller as Shirley
 Alessandra de Rossi as Emily
 Cris Cruz as Emil
 Ian de Leon as Fred
 Gigette Reyes as Leona
 Rayver Cruz as young Joseph
 Eugene Domingo as Belen
 Chat Silayan-Bailon as Elaine
 Francis Ricafort as Jonard
 Joepri Mariano as Ricky
 Viel Lobitana as Viel
 Bernabeth Joyce Elipane as Dindi De Guia

Book 2
 Patricia Javier as Kirara 
 Raymond Bagatsing as Miguel 
 Amy Austria as Rose
 Robin Da Rosa as Joseph
 Maureen Larrazabal as Sabrina
 Nicole Hofer as Jenny
 Alvin Anson as Raffy
 Marcus Madrigal as Michael

Accolades

References

External links
 

1999 Philippine television series debuts
2001 Philippine television series endings
Filipino-language television shows
GMA Network drama series
Television series by TAPE Inc.
Television shows set in the Philippines